Panjab University Campus Students Council or PUCSC is Students' union consisting of the departmental representatives and other office bearers like President, Vice-President, Secretary and Joint-Secretary along with 123 Departmental Representatives (DRs) directly elected by the students from the various teaching departments on the Panjab University, Chandigarh campus. Further, these elected office-bearers and department representatives elect the remaining five members of the executive of the Council. The Dean Student Welfare is ex officio Chairman of the Council. Elections are held every year in August–September months. There is ban on property defacement for clean elections.

Student representation
Panjab University has over 60% female students but only 15-20% of girl students vote or participate in election process, and until 2018, the Council president’s post was never headed by a girl in the history of the university elections. Thus PUCSC politics are mostly dominated by male students. As of 2018, PU has about 15541 student voters with UIET having the most voters, about 2451 students followed by UILS with 1345 and Department of Laws with 1050. But sometimes UIET and Law Dept. get less representation in Election panels. Freebies are offered by Student organisations to lure students especially freshers by movie tickets, free meals, Disc Parties, free trips, etc. Parties have to overcome regional and language barriers of students as the university has students from different parts of India. In 2015, along with student council elections, PU authorities also conducted a referendum to decide whether campus should be made a vehicle-free zone or not. In 2015, there was only a 56% turnout with 8,131 voters out of total 14,000 voted. In 2016, NOTA was introduced first time in campus elections and was used by 6 to 9 percent of students.

Budget

Elections in affiliated colleges
Elections are also held in Colleges only in Chandigarh that are affiliated to Panjab University and these are:
GGDSD College, Sector 32, Chandigarh
MCM DAV College for Women, Sector 36-A, Chandigarh
DAV College, Sector 10, Chandigarh
Sri Guru Gobind Singh College for Women, Sector 26
Sri Guru Gobind Singh College, Sector 26
Dev Samaj College for Women, Sector 45
Post Graduate Government College, Sector 11
Post Graduate Government College for Girls, Sector 42
Post Graduate Government College for Girls, Sector 11
Post Graduate Government College, Sector 46
Government College for Commerce and Business Administration, Sector 50

Student issues
There are many issues that is a responsibility of Council to solve.
Women's Safety
Vehicle (four-wheeler) Free Campus
Placements
Stray Dogs and Monkeys on campus leading to rabid bites
University Fees hike
New Hostels
24-hour hostel timing for girls
Central University Status
Regarding Foreign students, as sometimes these students face problems.
Implementation of reservation in Panjab University Senate and Syndicate

Council Presidents
Since 1977, the Council was usually represented by students leaders of campus-based parties like SOPU (Student Organisation of Panjab University) and PUSU (Panjab University Students' Union). But in 2013, first time Congress-affiliated NSUI won the Council President's post new President of Panjab University Ayush Khatkar from (Jind, Haryana). In 2015, as another surprise, first-time PUCSC president from Shiromani Akali Dal (Badal)'s student wing SOI was elected. In 2016, Amritpal Singh, first SC presidential candidate in PU from Students For Society (SFS) gave an impressive performance with 2494 votes the first time in campus student politics due to its successful rallies. In 2018 Kanupriya was elected as the first female president of PUCSC, of Panjab University, from SFS. In October 2022, Aam Aadmi Party (AAP) students’ wing Chhatra Yuva Sangharsh Samiti (CYSS) candidate Aayush Khatkar became the President of PUCSC.

Presidents of PUCSC

Notable student organisations
In 1974, Ajaib Singh founded Progressive Students’ Union (PSU) as in 1977 first elected president was Bhupinderpal Singh Khosa. PUSU was formed in 1977 and SOPU in 1985 while NSUI first contested at PU Campus in 1997 and ABVP won an office-bearer post in 2000. Different Organisations take part in Activities and compaigning.

Non political organisations
Ambedkar Students' Association (ASA) is a non political student organization and doesn't participates in PUCSC elections but works for welfare of all poor students on campus especially from Other Backward Class (OBC), Scheduled Castes and Scheduled Tribes (SC/ST) communities.

Political organisations
These student organisations participate in PUCSC elections:
PUSU (Since 1977)
SOPU (Since 1985)
Students For Society (SFS)
ABVP, student wing affiliated to BJP-RSS
NSUI, student wing of Indian National Congress
SOI, student wing of Shiromani Akali Dal
INSO, student wing of Haryana based Jannayak Janta Party
CYSS (Chhatra Yuva Sangharsh Samiti), student wing of Aam Aadmi Party
All India Students Association (AISA), student wing of Communist Party of India (Marxist–Leninist) Liberation
GGSU, student wing of Gandhi group gang of Khanna
PPSO (Pal Phalwan Student Organisation)
PFUS, Panjab Feminist Union of Students
Indian Student's Association (ISA)
NSO
HPSU
HIMSU
SAP
HSA or Hindustan Student Association (since 2009 )
KCSU
College Student Front (Since 2017)

References

External links
 
 Dean Students Welfare Contact
 Campus Students
 PU Campus TV coverage

Students' unions in India
Panjab University
Student politics in India
Students' unions